{{Infobox television
| image                =
| caption              = 
| alt_name             = 
| genre                = 
| creator              = 
| developer            = 
| writer               = Steve CooganPeter Baynham
| director             = Geoff Posner
| creative_director    = 
| presenter            = 
| starring             = Steve Coogan
| voices               = 
| theme_music_composer = 
| opentheme            = 
| endtheme             = 
| composer             = 
| country              = United Kingdom
| language             = 
| num_series           = 
| num_episodes         = 
| list_episodes        = 
| executive_producer   = 
| producer             = Geoff PosnerDavid Tyler
| editor               = 
| location             = 
| cinematography       = 
| camera               = 
| runtime              = 
| company              = BBC
| channel              = BBC Two
| picture_format       = 576i
| audio_format         = 
| first_aired          = 
| last_aired           =
| related              = The Tony Ferrino Phenomenon 
}}Introducing Tony Ferrino - Who? And Why? A Quest was a spoof television documentary about the life of Tony Ferrino, the parody Portuguese musical megastar played by Steve Coogan. It was written by Coogan and produced by Pozzitive Television.

The interview followed on from The Tony Ferrino Phenomenon, broadcast on New Year's Day, 1997, a spoof concert given by Tony Ferrino (Coogan) which featured pop stars Mick Hucknall, Kim Wilde and Gary Wilmot in cameo roles.Introducing Tony Ferrino - Who? And Why? A Quest was broadcast the next day, ostensibly as a follow-up interview to maintain the illusion that Tony Ferrino was a real character, in which Peter Baynham joined Coogan as the slightly put-upon interviewer Ross Woollard.

Reception

The character of Tony Ferrino was positively received, with The Tony Ferrino Phenomenon winning a Silver Rose at the Rose D'Or awards in Montreaux. Coogan revived the character in his 1998 national tour 'The Man Who Thinks He's It', described by The Guardian'' as "raucously funny".

References

Mockumentaries
1997 television films
1997 films
BBC television comedy